Hasanabad-e Qadim (also Romanized as Ḩasanābād-e Qadīm; also known as Ḩasanābād) is a village in Oryad Rural District, in the Central District of Mahneshan County, Zanjan Province, Iran. At the 2006 census, its population was 67, in 14 families.

References 

Populated places in Mahneshan County